Uroš Kabić  (born 1 January 2004) is a Serbian professional footballer who plays as a winger for Vojvodina.

Club career

Vojvodina
On 30 October 2020, Kabić made his first team debut, replacing Aranđel Stojković in 73rd minute in 3:1 home win against Bačka.

International career
Kabić was called in Serbia U16 national team squad during the 2019, and played two friendly games against Slovakia U16. After that, he was member of a national U17 team, and debut against Bulgaria U17.

Career statistics

References

External links
 
 

Living people
2004 births
Serbian footballers
Association football midfielders 
FK Vojvodina players
Serbian SuperLiga players
Footballers from Novi Sad
Serbia youth international footballers